Thou Shalt Not is a 1919 American silent drama film directed by Charles Brabin and starring Evelyn Nesbit, Ned Burton and Crauford Kent.

Cast
 Evelyn Nesbit as Ruth
 Ned Burton as Ruth's Father
 Florida Kingsley as Ruth's Mother
 Gladden James as Alec Peters
 Crauford Kent as The Minister
 Edward Lawrence as Rural Swain

References

Bibliography
Parish, James Robert & Pitts, Michael R. . Film Directors: A Guide to their American Films. Scarecrow Press, 1974.

External links
 

1919 films
1919 drama films
1910s English-language films
American silent feature films
Silent American drama films
American black-and-white films
Films directed by Charles Brabin
Fox Film films
1910s American films